Denis Dyca (born 11 January 1996) is an Albanian football player who plays as a striker.

References

1996 births
Living people
Footballers from Shkodër
Albanian footballers
Association football midfielders
KF Vllaznia Shkodër players
KS Kastrioti players
FK Tomori Berat players
KS Veleçiku Koplik players
KS Burreli players
Kategoria Superiore players
Kategoria e Parë players